Ansty Cross is a village in Dorset, England.

Villages in Dorset